Prothalotia chlorites is a species of sea snail, a marine gastropod mollusk in the family Trochidae, the top snails.

Description
The height of the shell attains 7 mm, its diameter 6 mm. The imperforate shell has an obliquely pyramidal shape. Its color is yellowish-green without spots.  The whorls are entirely flat and are transversely sulcate-striate, marginate. Each whorl has 5 elevated transverse lines. The angle of the body whorl is rounded. The base of the shell is slightly convex and contains numerous transverse lines, mostly punctate. The suture is profound. The aperture is subquadrangular. The lip is smooth within. The columella is pretty vertical.

Distribution
This marine species is endemic to Australia and occurs off Western Australia.

References

 Menke, C.T. 1843. Molluscorum Novae Hollandiae Specimen in Libraria Aulica Hahniana. Hannover : Hahniana 46 pp

chlorites
Gastropods of Australia
Gastropods described in 1846